The 2006 National Invitation Tournament was the first time the tournament was planned and operated by the NCAA, taking over after 68 years under the auspices of the Metropolitan Intercollegiate Basketball Association (MIBA).  The 2006 NIT also saw changes made to the selection process as well as being the first time the NIT seeded the participants. The South Carolina Gamecocks won their second straight NIT title.

Selected teams
Below are lists of the team selected for the tournament.  The teams were given seeds for the first time ever.

Bracket
Below are the four brackets of the tournament, along with the bracket of the four-team championship round.

Maryland Bracket

Michigan Bracket

Louisville Bracket

Cincinnati Bracket

Semifinals & finals

See also
 2006 Women's National Invitation Tournament
 2006 NCAA Division I men's basketball tournament
 2006 NCAA Division II men's basketball tournament
 2006 NCAA Division III men's basketball tournament
 2006 NCAA Division I women's basketball tournament
 2006 NCAA Division II women's basketball tournament
 2006 NCAA Division III women's basketball tournament
 2006 NAIA Division I men's basketball tournament
 2006 NAIA Division II men's basketball tournament
 2006 NAIA Division I women's basketball tournament
 2006 NAIA Division II women's basketball tournament

References

National Invitation
National Invitation Tournament
2000s in Manhattan
College sports in New York City
Madison Square Garden
National Invitation Tournament
National Invitation Tournament
Basketball competitions in New York City
Sports in Manhattan